Callorhinus is a genus of sea lion. It contains the living northern fur seal (Callorhinus ursinus) as well as the extinct Callorhinus gilmorei and an unnamed species, both from the Pliocene and very beginning of the Pleistocene. 

Callorhinus may be a sister genus to the extinct giant otariid, Thalassoleon.

References

Mammal genera
Mammal genera with one living species
Eared seals
Taxa named by John Edward Gray
Mammals described in 1859